The Hollingshead Covered Bridge No. 40 is an historic wooden covered bridge which is located in Catawissa Township in Columbia County, Pennsylvania. 

It was listed on the National Register of Historic Places in 1979.

History and architectural features
It crosses the Catawissa Creek. It is one of twenty-eight historic covered bridges in Columbia and Montour Counties.

This covered bridge was listed on the National Register of Historic Places in 1979.

References 

Covered bridges on the National Register of Historic Places in Pennsylvania
Covered bridges in Columbia County, Pennsylvania
Bridges completed in 1850
Wooden bridges in Pennsylvania
Bridges in Columbia County, Pennsylvania
National Register of Historic Places in Columbia County, Pennsylvania
Road bridges on the National Register of Historic Places in Pennsylvania
Burr Truss bridges in the United States